Harald Johan «Dutte» Berg (born 9 November 1941) is a Norwegian former footballer who played as a midfielder. Nickname "Dutte", he is the brother of Knut Berg, the father of Ørjan Berg, Runar Berg and Arild Berg, and grandfather of Patrick Berg (son of Ørjan) – all of whom have played in the Norwegian top division and been selected for the Norway national football team.

Club career
Born in Bodø, Berg was a significant player for Bodø/Glimt in the late 1950s, early 1960s and 1970s, and Lyn in the 1960s. Helping Lyn winning the league in 1968 and Bodø/Glimt winning the cup final in 1975. In 1969 Lyn and Berg got to the quarter-finale in the European Cup Winners' Cup losing 2–3 and 2–2 to the Spanish giant F.C. Barcelona, it sticks to the story that Lyn had to play both matches in Spain due to the harsh weather conditions in Norway at winter.

In the early 1970s Berg played at FC Den Haag in the Netherlands for three seasons.

Harald Berg returned to his mother club in 1974. Back in his home town Bodø, Berg had a Diego Armando Maradona role on the pitch. Bergs decisive contribution as a playmaker made Bodø/Glimt a top Norwegian club in the mid-1970s. He played his last Norwegian top flight match in 1980 the year Bodø/Glimt was relegated. Berg played another season for Bodø/Glimt, then retired after the 1981 season, at the age of 40. In 1983, he briefly managed the team.

International career
He made his debut for Norway in 1964 and went on to collect 43 caps, scoring 12 international goals. His last international match was in 1974.

Honours
Lyn
 Norwegian top division: 1968
 Norwegian Cup: 1967, 1968

Bodø/Glimt
Norwegian Cup: 1975

Individual
Norwegian top division top scorer:''' 1965

References

External links

1941 births
Living people
Sportspeople from Bodø
Norwegian footballers
Association football midfielders
Norway international footballers
Eliteserien players
Eredivisie players
FK Bodø/Glimt players
Lyn Fotball players
ADO Den Haag players
Norwegian football managers
FK Bodø/Glimt managers
Norwegian expatriate footballers
Norwegian expatriate sportspeople in the Netherlands
Expatriate footballers in the Netherlands
Berg family